is a 1964 Nikkatsu film directed by Koreyoshi Kurahara based on a story by Tensei Kono and starring Tamio Kawachi and Chico Lourant (often cited as Chico Roland). The film had many of the same cast, crew, and characters as Kurahara's earlier film The Warped Ones.

Cast
Source:

 Tamio Kawachi as Akira
 Chico Roland as Gill
 Tatsuya Fuji as Akira's friend
 Shogen Shinda as the Engineer
 Yuko Chishiro as Yuki
 Hideji Ōtaki as Old Man of the Junk Shop
 Zenji Yamada as Owner

Plot
At the start of the film, Mei commits larceny and buys a jazz record, an upbeat recording of "Six Bits Blues". In town, he encounters civil insurrection following the killing of an American soldier, presumably by one of his colleagues who is now missing. When Mei returns to his home and his dog Monk in a half-destroyed church, the missing soldier appears from behind a curtain and points a gun at him. His leg is injured, supposedly by the real assailant's firearm. Since the soldier (Gill) is African-American, Akira is convinced that he will appreciate the jazz record he bought and tries to use it as a way of communication. He plays a few songs on the record, but the G.I. responds badly and, in a fit of restlessness, attacks and kills Mei's dog.

Eventually, the soldier asks Mei to take him to the sea, for unknown reasons, and on their way there, they form a bond and become close friends. However, eventually they encounter MPs. In a moment of despair, the soldier sings "Six Bits Blues" as its original blues dirge, affecting Mei. Mei and Gill find their way to the top of a building, overlooking the sea, where Gill ties himself to a balloon. He asks Akira to cut the rope, hoping to float up in the air and from there, to see his mother one more time. Mei reluctantly fulfills his request and they all watch the soldier, buoyed on his airborne balloon, as he approaches the sea.

Music
The film featured music by the Japanese composer Toshiro Mayuzumi. and American jazz drummer Max Roach.

References

External links
 
 
 Chico Lourant, the Black Sun of Shibuya on The Tokyo Files

1964 films
1960s Japanese-language films
Films directed by Koreyoshi Kurahara
Japanese crime thriller films
1960s Japanese films